The Argentine Senior PGA Championship, or Campeonato Argentino de Profesionales Senior, is a senior men's professional golf tournament held in Argentina that was founded in 1987.

The first winner was Juan Carlos Molina. The most successful players are Florentino Molina and Horacio Carbonetti with three victories each.

Winners

External links
Argentine PGA – official site

Golf tournaments in Argentina
Senior golf tournaments
Recurring sporting events established in 1987
1987 establishments in Argentina